The Texas Rangers finished the 2005 season in 3rd place in the West division of the American League. The Rangers had four players in the 2005 All-Star Game. Michael Young, Kenny Rogers, Alfonso Soriano, and Mark Teixeira. Young was also the A.L. batting champion in 2005.

On offense, the team led Major League Baseball in home runs (260), at bats (5,716), slugging percentage (.468) and total bases (2,677). All starters wound up in double figures in home runs. The Rangers used 30 pitchers during the season, the most by any team.

Offseason
November 16, 2004: Jason Standridge was signed as a free agent with the Texas Rangers.
March 30, 2005: Cody Ransom was purchased by the Texas Rangers from the Chicago Cubs.

Regular season

Opening Day Starters
Rod Barajas, C
Mark Teixeira, 1B
Alfonso Soriano, 2B
Hank Blalock, 3B
Michael Young, SS
Kevin Mench, LF
Gary Matthews Jr., CF
Richard Hidalgo, RF
David Dellucci, DH
Ryan Drese, RHP

Season standings

Record vs. opponents

Transactions
May 25, 2005: Cody Ransom was released by the Texas Rangers.
June 30, 2005: Jason Standridge was released by the Texas Rangers.

Roster

Lone Star series
The annual interleague games between the Houston Astros and the Texas Rangers were played in June and July. They are known as the Lone Star Series.

Game log

|- style="background-color:#ffbbbb"
| 1 || April 5 ||@ Angels || 3–2 || Colón || Drese (0–1) || Rodríguez ||43,590 || 0–1
|- style="background-color:#bbffbb"
| 2 || April 6 ||@ Angels || 3–2 || Shouse (1–0) || Prinz  || ||35,077 || 1–1
|- style="background-color:#ffbbbb"
| 3 || April 7 ||@ Angels || 7–6 || Shields || Shouse (1–1) || ||35,169|| 1–2
|- style="background-color:#ffbbbb"
| 4 || April 8 ||@ Mariners || 9–6 || Putz || Regilio (0–1) || Guardado || 29,652 || 2–2
|- style="background-color:#bbffbb"
| 5 || April 9 ||@ Mariners || 7–6 || Brocail (1–0)|| Guardado || Cordero (1) || 31,501 || 2–3
|- style="background-color:#bbffbb"
| 6 || April 10 ||@ Mariners || 7–6 ||Riley (1–0) ||  Thornton|| Cordero (2) || 30,434 || 3–3
|- style="background-color:#ffbbbb"
| 7 || April 11 || Angels || 7–6 || Shields ||  Dickey (0–1) || Rodríguez || 50,054 || 3–4
|- style="background-color:#ffbbbb"
| 8 || April 12 || Angels || 13–8 || Lackey || Young (0–1) ||Shields || 23,061 || 3–5
|- style="background-color:#bbffbb"
| 9 || April 13 || Angels || 7–5 || Park (1–0) || Byrd || Cordero (3) || 21,625 || 4–5
|- style="background-color:#ffbbbb"
| 10 || April 14 || Blue Jays || 2–1 || Halladay || Astacio (0–1) || || 19,366 || 4–6
|- style="background-color:#bbffbb"
| 11 || April 15 || Blue Jays || 4–2 || Drese (1–1) || Lilly || Cordero (4) || 30,453 || 5–6
|- style="background-color:#ffbbbb"
| 12 || April 16 || Blue Jays || 8–0 || Chacín || Rogers (0–1) || || 40,499 || 5–7
|- style="background-color:#bbffbb"
| 13 || April 17 || Blue Jays || 6–5 || Young (1–1) || Towers || Cordero (5) || 31,310 || 6–7
|- style="background-color:#ffbbbb"
| 14 || April 18 || Athletics || 8–5 || Haren || Park (1–1) || Dotel || 20,939 || 6–8
|- style="background-color:#bbffbb"
| 15 || April 19 || Athletics || 3–0 || Astacio (1–1) || Blanton || Cordero (6) || 22,146 || 7–8
|- style="background-color:#bbffbb"
| 16 || April 20 || @ Devil Rays || 12–10 || Drese (2–1) || Webb || Cordero (7) || 8,816 || 8–8
|- style="background-color:#ffbbbb"
| 17 || April 21 || @ Devil Rays || 3–2 || Brazelton || Rogers (0–2) || Báez || 8,799 || 8–9
|- style="background-color:#bbffbb"
| 18 || April 22 || @ Yankees || 5–3 || Young (2–1) || Brown || Cordero (8) || 42,710 || 9–9
|- style="background-color:#bbffbb"
| 19 || April 23 || @ Yankees || 10–2 || Park (2–1) || Wright || || 44,731 || 10–9
|- style="background-color:#ffbbbb"
| 20 || April 24 || @ Yankees || 11–1 || Johnson || Astacio (1–2) || || 42,732 || 10–10
|- style="background-color:#ffbbbb"
| 21 || April 26 || Mariners || 7–4 || Piñeiro || Drese (2–2) || Guardado || 23,064 || 10–11
|- style="background-color:#bbffbb"
| 22 || April 27 || Mariners || 8–2 || Rogers (1–2) || Franklin || || 26,308 || 11–11
|- style="background-color:#ffbbbb"
| 23 || April 28 || Mariners || 4–1 || Meche || Young (2–2) || Guardado || 23,928 || 11–12
|- style="background-color:#bbffbb"
| 24 || April 29 || Red Sox || 7–2 || Park (3–1) || Wakefield || Mahay (1) || 43,933 || 12–12
|- style="background-color:#ffbbbb"
| 25 || April 30 || Red Sox || 9–2 || Arroyo || Astacio (1–3) || || 44,114 || 12–13

|- style="background-color:#ffbbbb"
| 26 || May 1 || Red Sox || 6–5 || Clement || Drese (2–3) || Foulke || 49,342 || 12–14
|- style="background-color:#bbffbb"
| 27 || May 2 || @Athletics || 3–2 || Shouse (2–1) || Harden || Cordero (9) || 10,144 || 13–14
|- style="background-color:#bbffbb"
| 28 || May 3 || @Athletics || 6–1 || Young (3–2) || Saarloos || || 10,427 || 14–14
|- style="background-color:#bbffbb"
| 29 || May 4 || @Athletics || 16–7 || Rogers (2–2) || Haren || || 15,654 || 15–14
|- style="background-color:#ffbbbb"
| 30 || May 6 || Indians || 8–6 || Lee || Astacio (1–4) || Wickman || 30,742 || 15–15
|- style="background-color:#bbffbb"
| 31 || May 7 || Indians || 6–1 || Drese (3–3) || Elarton || || 36,311 || 16–15
|- style="background-color:#bbffbb"
| 32 || May 8 || Indians || 7–2 || Rogers (3–2) || Westbrook || Cordero (10) || 23,203 || 17–15
|- style="background-color:#ffbbbb"
| 33 || May 9 || Tigers || 2–0 || Robertson || Cordero (0–1) || || 24,122 || 17–16
|- style="background-color:#bbffbb"
| 34 || May 10 || Tigers || 5–4 || Brocail (2–0) || Johnson || Cordero (11) || 24,766 || 18–16
|- style="background-color:#ffbbbb"
| 35 || May 11 || Tigers || 6–5 || Walker || Mahay (0–1) || Urbina || 28,689 || 18–17
|- style="background-color:#bbffbb"
| 36 || May 13 || @Twins || 9–6 || Brocail (3–0) ||Nathan || Cordero (12) || 24,524 || 19–17
|- style="background-color:#bbffbb"
| 37 || May 14 || @Twins || 5–0 || Rogers (4–2) || Silva || || 28,624 || 20–17
|- style="background-color:#ffbbbb"
| 38 || May 15 || @Twins || 5–2 || Radke || Mahay (0–2) || Nathan || 27,891 || 20–18
|- style="background-color:#bbffbb"
| 39 || May 16 || @White Sox || 7–6 || Regilio (1–1) || Marte || Cordero (13) || 26,889 || 21–18
|- style="background-color:#ffbbbb"
| 40 || May 17 || @White Sox || 5–2 || Garland || Astacio (1–5) ||  Hermanson || 18,333 || 21–19
|- style="background-color:#ffbbbb"
| 41 || May 18 || @White Sox || 7–0 || Buehrle || Drese (3–4) || || 16,255 || 21–20
|- style="background-color:#bbffbb"
| 42 || May 20 || Astros || 7–3 || Rogers (5–2) || Backe || || 38,109 || 22–20
|- style="background-color:#bbffbb"
| 43 || May 21 || Astros || 18–3 || Young (4–2) || Astacio || || 35,781 || 23–20
|- style="background-color:#bbffbb"
| 44 || May 22 || Astros || 2–0 || Park (4–1) || Oswalt || Cordero (14) || 40,583 || 24–20
|- style="background-color:#bbffbb"
| 45 || May 24 || Royals || 4–3 || Drese (4–4) ||Hernández || Cordero (15) || 27,449 || 25–20
|- style="background-color:#bbffbb"
| 46 || May 25 || Royals || 7–3 || Astacio (2–5) || Greinke || || 23,755 || 26–20
|- style="background-color:#bbffbb"
| 47 || May 26 || Royals || 8–1 || Rogers (6–2) || Lima || || 25,022 || 27–20
|- style="background-color:#bbffbb"
| 48 || May 27 || White Sox || 6–2 || Young (5–2) || McCarthy || Cordero (16) || 31,149 || 28–20
|- style="background-color:#bbbbbb"
| -- || May 28 || colspan=6 | Postponed || 29–20
|- style="background-color:#bbffbb"
| 49 || May 29 || White Sox || 12–4 || Park (5–1) || Garland || || 36,265 || 29–20
|- style="background-color:#bbffbb"
| 50 || May 31 || @Tigers || 8–2 || Rogers (7–2) ||  Maroth || || 16,931 || 30–20

|- style="background-color:#ffbbbb"
| 51 || June 1 || @Tigers || 6–4 || Bonderman || Drese (4–5) || Urbina || 15,428 || 30–21
|- style="background-color:#ffbbbb"
| 52 || June 2 || @Tigers || 6–5 || Urbina || Regilio (1–2) || || 21,166 || 30–22
|- style="background-color:#ffbbbb"
| 53 || June 3 || @Royals || 2–1 || Sisco || Astacio (2–6) || MacDougal || 11,635 || 30–23
|- style="background-color:#bbffbb"
| 54 || June 4 || @Royals || 14–9 || Park (6–1) || Lima || || 18,808 || 31–23
|- style="background-color:#bbffbb"
| 55 || June 5 || @Royals || 8–1 || Rogers (8–2) || Greinke || || 21,424 || 32–23
|- style="background-color:#ffbbbb"
| 56 || June 7 || @Phillies || 8–5 || Lieber || Drese (4–6) || Wagner || 33,616 || 32–24
|- style="background-color:#ffbbbb"
| 57 || June 8 || @Phillies || 2–0 || Fultz|| Young (5–3) ||  Wagner || 24,339 || 32–25
|- style="background-color:#ffbbbb"
| 58 || June 9 || @Phillies || 10–8 || Padilla || Astacio (2–7) ||  Wagner || 25,205 || 32–26
|- style="background-color:#ffbbbb"
| 59 || June 10 || @Marlins || 12–5 || Jones || Brocail (3–1) || || 16,622 || 32–27
|- style="background-color:#ffbbbb"
| 60 || June 11 || @Marlins || 6–5 || Riedling || Domínguez (0–1) || Jones || 25,557 || 32–28
|- style="background-color:#bbffbb"
| 61 || June 12 || @Marlins || 6–2 || Rodríguez (1–0) || Moehler || Wasdin (1) || 21,303 || 33–28
|- style="background-color:#bbffbb"
| 62 || June 13 || Braves || 7–3 || Young (6–3) || Hudson || || 41,594 || 34–28
|- style="background-color:#ffbbbb"
| 63 || June 14 || Braves || 7–2 || Sosa || Astacio (2–8) || || 30,221 || 34–29
|- style="background-color:#bbffbb"
| 64 || June 15 || Braves || 9–5 || Park (7–1) || Davies || Cordero (17) || 33,663 || 35–29
|- style="background-color:#bbffbb"
| 65 || June 17 || Nationals || 8–1 || Rogers (9–2) || Patterson || || 33,653 || 36–29
|- style="background-color:#bbffbb"
| 66 || June 18 || Nationals || 7–4 || Rodríguez (2–0)|| Armas || || 48,663 || 37–29
|- style="background-color:#ffbbbb"
| 67 || June 19 || Nationals || 8–2 || Hughes || Wilson (0–1) || || 34,474 || 37–30
|- style="background-color:#ffbbbb"
| 68 || June 20 || @Angels || 5–1 || Byrd || Young (6–4) || || 41,007 || 37–31
|- style="background-color:#ffbbbb"
| 69 || June 21 || @Angels || 8–6 || Colón || Park (7–2) || || 43,025 || 37–32
|- style="background-color:#ffbbbb"
| 70 || June 22 || @Angels || 6–0 || Washburn || Rogers (9–3) || || 41,763 || 37–33
|- style="background-color:#ffbbbb"
| 71 || June 24 || @Astros || 5–2 || Oswalt || Rodríguez (2–1) || Lidge || 36,199 || 37–34
|- style="background-color:#bbffbb"
| 72 || June 25 || @Astros || 6–5 || Young (7–4) || Backe || Cordero (18) || 41,868 || 38–34
|- style="background-color:#ffbbbb"
| 73 || June 26 || @Astros || 3–2 || Qualls || Domínguez (0–2) || || 35,331 || 38–35
|- style="background-color:#ffbbbb"
| 74 || June 27 || Angels || 13–3 || Colón || Wilson (0–2) || || 34,471 || 38–36
|- style="background-color:#ffbbbb"
| 75 || June 28 || Angels || 5–1 ||  Donnelly || Loe (0–1) || || 27,159 || 38–37
|- style="background-color:#bbffbb"
| 76 || June 29 || Angels || 7–6 || Loe (1–1) || Shields || || 30,112 || 39–37
|- style="background-color:#bbffbb"
| 77 || June 30 || Angels || 18–5 || Young (8–4) || Santana || || 27,466 || 40–37

|- style="background-color:#bbffbb"
| 78 || July 1 || @Mariners || 6–2 || Park (8–2) || Sele || || 37,270 || 41–37
|- style="background-color:#bbffbb"
| 79 || July 2 || @Mariners || 6–5 || Loe (2–1) || Putz || Cordero (19) || 34,209 || 42–37
|- style="background-color:#ffbbbb"
| 80 || July 3 || @Mariners || 2–1 || Moyer || Rogers (9–4) || Guardado || 34,397 || 42–38
|- style="background-color:#bbffbb"
| 81 || July 4 || Red Sox || 6–5 || Benoit (1–0) || Foulke || || 50,492 || 43–38
|- style="background-color:#ffbbbb"
| 82 || July 5 || Red Sox || 7–4 || Wakefield || Young (8–5) || Timlin || 33,356 || 43–39
|- style="background-color:#ffbbbb"
| 83 || July 6 || Red Sox || 7–4 || Clement || Park (8–3) || Embree || 34,962 || 43–40
|- style="background-color:#bbffbb"
| 84 || July 8 || Blue Jays || 7–6 || Cordero (1–1) || Batista || || 30,242 || 44–40
|- style="background-color:#bbffbb"
| 85 || July 9 || Blue Jays || 12–10 || Rogers (10–4) || Downs || Cordero (20) || 36,285 || 45–40
|- style="background-color:#bbffbb"
| 86 || July 10 || Blue Jays || 9–8 || Loe (3–1) || Frasor || || 25,767 || 46–40
|- style="background-color:#ffbbbb"
| 87 || July 14 || @Athletics || 6–0 || Harden || Park (8–4) || || 17,987 || 46–41
|- style="background-color:#ffbbbb"
| 88 || July 15 || @Athletics || 7–2 || Zito || Wasdin (0–1) || || 22,423 || 46–42
|- style="background-color:#bbffbb"
| 89 || July 16 || @Athletics || 10–8 || Rogers (11–4) || Blanton || Cordero (21) || 22,826 || 47–42
|- style="background-color:#ffbbbb"
| 90 || July 17 || @Athletics || 5–4 || Kennedy || Loe (3–2) || || 25,330 || 47–43
|- style="background-color:#ffbbbb"
| 91 || July 18 || Yankees || 11–10 || Sturtze || Brocail (3–2) || Rivera || 46,538 || 47–44
|- style="background-color:#bbffbb"
| 92 || July 19 || Yankees || 2–1 || Loe (4–2) || Franklin || Cordero (22) || 45,208 || 48–44
|- style="background-color:#ffbbbb"
| 93 || July 20 || Yankees || 8–4 || Small || Benoit (1–1) || || 45,354 || 48-45
|- style="background-color:#ffbbbb"
| 94 || July 21 || Athletics || 6–4 || Witasick || Loe (4–3) || Street || 31,643 || 48–46
|- style="background-color:#ffbbbb"
| 95 || July 22 || Athletics || 11–10 || Haren || Young (8–6) || || 35,266 || 48–47
|- style="background-color:#ffbbbb"
| 96 || July 23 || Athletics || 5–4 || Saarloos || Rodríguez (2–2) ||Street || 38,841 || 48–48
|- style="background-color:#ffbbbb"
| 97 || July 24 || Athletics || 8–3 || Harden || Park (8–5) || || 29,410 || 48–49
|- style="background-color:#bbffbb"
| 98 || July 25 || Orioles || 4–2 || Benoit (2–1) || Cabrera || Cordero (23) || 29,314 || 49–49
|- style="background-color:#ffbbbb"
| 99 || July 26 || @Orioles || 5–4 || Grimsley || Baldwin (0–1) || Ryan || 25,235 || 49–50
|- style="background-color:#bbffbb"
| 100 || July 27 || @Orioles || 11–8 || Cordero (2–1) || Julio || Baldwin (1) || 31,540 || 50–50
|- style="background-color:#bbffbb"
| 101 || July 28 || @Orioles || 2–1 || Loe (5–3) || Ray || Cordero (24) || 22,254 || 51–50
|- style="background-color:#bbffbb"
| 102 || July 29 || @Blue Jays || 4–1 || Brocail (4–2) || Downs || Cordero (25) || 21,113 || 52–50
|- style="background-color:#bbffbb"
| 103 || July 30 || @Blue Jays || 3–2 || Benoit (3–1) || Frasor || Cordero (26) || 23,039 || 53–50
|- style="background-color:#ffbbbb"
| 104 || July 31 || @Blue Jays || 5–1 || Chacín || Wilson (0–3) || || 24,123 || 53–51

|- style="background-color:#ffbbbb"
| 105 || August 2 || Devil Rays || 10–8 || McClung ||Young (8–7) || Báez || 30,038 || 53–52
|- style="background-color:#ffbbbb"
| 106 || August 3 || Devil Rays || 8–5 || Harper || Rodríguez (2–3) || Báez || 30,513 || 53–53
|- style="background-color:#bbffbb"
| 107 || August 4 || Devil Rays || 13–5 || Gryboski (1–0) || Orvella || || 27,176 || 54–53
|- style="background-color:#ffbbbb"
| 108 || August 5 || Orioles || 10–5 || Chen || Wilson (0–4) || || 37,296 || 54–54
|- style="background-color:#bbffbb"
| 109 || August 6 || Orioles || 10–3 || Wasdin (1–1) || Cabrera ||Loe (1) || 34,632 || 55–54
|- style="background-color:#bbffbb"
| 110 || August 7 || Orioles || 9–3 || Young (9–7) || Ponson || || 27,137 || 56–54
|- style="background-color:#ffbbbb"
| 111 || August 8 || @Red Sox || 11–6 || González || Karsay (0–1) || || 35,453 || 56–55
|- style="background-color:#ffbbbb"
| 112 || August 9 || @Red Sox || 8–7 || Schilling || Gryboski (1–1) || || 35,308 || 56–56
|- style="background-color:#ffbbbb"
| 113 || August 10 || @Red Sox || 16–5 || Arroyo || Rogers (11–5) || || 35,379 || 56–57
|- style="background-color:#ffbbbb"
| 114 || August 11 || @Yankees || 9–8 || Sturtze || Baldwin (0–2) || Rivera || 54,283 || 56–58
|- style="background-color:#ffbbbb"
| 115 || August 12 || @Yankees || 6–5 || Leiter || Wilson (0–5) || Sturtze || 54,442 || 56–59
|- style="background-color:#ffbbbb"
| 116 || August 13 || @Yankees || 7–5 || Small || Loe (5–4) || || 54,919 || 56–60
|- style="background-color:#ffbbbb"
| 117 || August 14 || @Yankees || 10–3 || Chacón || Benoit (3–2) || || 54,824 || 56–61
|- style="background-color:#ffbbbb"
| 118 || August 16 || @Indians || 8–2 || Sabathia || Rogers (11–6) || || 27,403 || 56–62
|- style="background-color:#bbffbb"
| 119 || August 17 || @Indians || 3–0 || Young (10–7) || Millwood || Cordero (27) || 20,442 || 57–62
|- style="background-color:#ffbbbb"
| 120 || August 18 || @Indians || 9–4 || Westbrook || Wilson (0–6) || || 23,214 || 57–63
|- style="background-color:#ffbbbb"
| 121 || August 19 || @Devil Rays || 2–1 || McClung || Domínguez (0–3) ||Báez || 10,188 || 57–64
|- style="background-color:#ffbbbb"
| 122 || August 20 || @Devil Rays || 4–2 || Kazmir || Benoit (3–3) || Baez || 19,041 || 57–65
|- style="background-color:#ffbbbb"
| 123 || August 21 || @Devil Rays || 6–3 || Fossum ||Rogers (11–7) || Báez || 13,974 || 57–66
|- style="background-color:#bbffbb"
| 124 || August 23 || Mariners || 6–4 || Young (11–7) || Moyer || Cordero (28) || 25,653 || 58–66
|- style="background-color:#bbffbb"
| 125 || August 24 || Mariners || 8–1 || Domínguez (1–3) || Franklin ||  Wasdin (2) || 28,612 || 59–66
|- style="background-color:#ffbbbb"
| 126 || August 25 || Mariners || 8–2 || Harris || Benoit (3–4) || || 19,112 || 59–67
|- style="background-color:#bbffbb"
| 127 || August 26 || Twins || 6–0 || Loe (6–4) || Kyle Lohse || Wilson (1) || 28,877 || 60–67
|- style="background-color:#ffbbbb"
| 128 || August 27 || Twins || 7–2 || Nathan || Shouse (2–2) || || 25,351 || 60–68
|- style="background-color:#bbffbb"
| 129 || August 28 || Twins || 2–1 || Brocail (5–2) || Crain || || 20,882 || 61–68
|- style="background-color:#bbffbb"
| 130 || August 29 || White Sox || 7–5 || Domínguez (2–3) || Buehrle || Brocail (1) || 27,819 || 62–68
|- style="background-color:#bbffbb"
| 131 || August 30 || White Sox || 8–6 || Wilson (1–6) || Garland || Cordero (29) || n/a || 63–68
|- style="background-color:#ffbbbb"
| 132 || August 30 || White Sox || 8–0 || McCarthy || Vólquez (0–1) || || 28,183 || 63–69
|- style="background-color:#bbffbb"
| 133 || August 31 || White Sox || 9–2 || Loe (7–4) || Hernández || || 23,493 || 64–69

|- style="background-color:#bbffbb"
| 134 || September 1 || @Royals || 5–4 || Rogers (12–7) || Howell || Cordero (30) || 12,735 || 65–69
|- style="background-color:#bbffbb"
| 135 || September 2 || @Royals || 8–7 || Cordero (3–1) || MacDougal ||  Wasdin (3) || 14,425 || 66–69
|- style="background-color:#bbffbb"
| 136 || September 3 || @Royals || 5–3 || Domínguez (3–3)|| Carrasco || || 18,932 || 67–69
|- style="background-color:#ffbbbb"
| 137 || September 4 || @Royals || 17–8 ||Núñez || Vólquez (0–2) || || 15,512 || 67–70
|- style="background-color:#bbffbb"
| 138 || September 5 || @Twins || 7–0 || Loe (8–4) || Silva || || 15,627 || 68–70
|- style="background-color:#bbffbb"
| 139 || September 6 || @Twins || 10–7 ||  Wasdin (2–1)|| Nathan || Cordero (31) || 12,564 || 69–70
|- style="background-color:#ffbbbb"
| 140 || September 7 || @Twins || 8–6 || Romero || Brocail (5–3) || Nathan || 13,034 || 69–71
|- style="background-color:#ffbbbb"
| 141 || September 9 || Athletics || 9–8 || Zito || Domínguez (3–4) || Street || 26,468 || 69–72
|- style="background-color:#ffbbbb"
| 142 || September 10 || Athletics || 5–4 || Blanton|| Loe (8–5)|| Street || 41,058 || 69–73
|- style="background-color:#bbffbb"
| 143 || September 11 || Athletics || 7–4|| Rogers (13–7)|| Kennedy ||  Wasdin (4) || 19,913 || 70–73
|- style="background-color:#ffbbbb"
| 144 || September 12 || Orioles || 4–2 || Cabrera || Vólquez (0–3) ||Ryan || 20,418 || 70–74
|- style="background-color:#ffbbbb"
| 145 || September 13 || Orioles || 4–3 || Ray|| Wilson (1–7) || Ryan || 21,167 || 70–75
|- style="background-color:#bbffbb"
| 146 || September 14 || Orioles || 7–6 || Benoit (4–4) || Grimsley || || 18,077 || 71–75
|- style="background-color:#bbffbb"
| 147 || September 15 || Mariners || 4–3 || Loe (9–5) || Harris || Cordero (32) || 23,679 || 72–75
|- style="background-color:#bbffbb"
| 148 || September 16 || Mariners || 5–3 || Rupe (1–0) || Hernández || Cordero (33) || 25,567 || 73–75
|- style="background-color:#bbffbb"
| 149 || September 17 || Mariners || 7–6 || Shouse (3–2) || Guardado || || 41,983 || 74–75
|- style="background-color:#bbffbb"
| 150 || September 18 || Mariners || 8–6 || Dickey (1–1) || Franklin || Cordero (34) || 26,532 || 75–75
|- style="background-color:#ffbbbb"
| 151 || September 20 || @Angels || 2–1 || Colón || Domínguez (3–5) || Rodríguez || 36,170 || 75–76
|- style="background-color:#ffbbbb"
| 152 || September 21 || @Angels || 6–5 || Yan || Feldman (0–1) || Rodríguez || 37,776 || 75–77
|- style="background-color:#ffbbbb"
| 153 || September 22 || @Angels || 7–4 || Santana || Vólquez (0–4) ||  Escobar || 36,588 || 75–78
|- style="background-color:#bbffbb"
| 154 || September 23 || @Athletics || 3–1 || Rogers (14–7)|| Haren || Cordero (35) || 33,402 || 76–78
|- style="background-color:#ffbbbb"
| 155 || September 24 || @Athletics || 7–6|| Duchscherer ||  Wasdin (2–2) || Street || 26,704 || 76–79
|- style="background-color:#bbffbb"
| 156 || September 25 || @Athletics || 6–2 ||Domínguez (4–5) || Saarloos || || 27,709 || 77–79
|- style="background-color:#bbffbb"
| 157 || September 27 || @Mariners || 3–2 || Wasdin (3–2) || Mateo || Cordero (36) || 22,739 || 78–79
|- style="background-color:#bbffbb"
| 158 || September 28 || @Mariners || 7–3 || Young (12–7)|| Piñeiro || Cordero (37) || 20,723 || 79–79
|- style="background-color:#ffbbbb"
| 159 || September 29 || @Mariners || 4–3 || Franklin|| Rogers (14–8) || Guardado || 19,481 || 79–80
|- style="background-color:#ffbbbb"
| 160 || September 30 || Angels ||7–1 || Lackey || Dickey (1–2) || || 38,187 || 79–81
|- style="background-color:#ffbbbb"
| 161 || October 1 || Angels || 7–6 || Shields || Domínguez (4–6) ||Rodríguez || 48,174 || 79–82
|- style="background-color:#ffbbbb"
| 162 || October 2 || Angels || 7–4 || Santana || Loe (9–6) || Rodríguez || 38,334 || 79–83

|-
|Source: ESPN.com

Player stats

Batting
Note: Pos = Position; G = Games played; AB = At bats; H = Hits; Avg. = Batting average; HR = Home runs; RBI = Runs batted in

Other batters
Note: G = Games played; AB = At bats; H = Hits; Avg. = Batting average; HR = Home runs; RBI = Runs batted in

Pitching

Starting pitchers
Note: G = Games pitched; IP = Innings pitched; W = Wins; L = Losses; ERA = Earned run average; SO = Strikeouts

Other pitchers
Note: G = Games pitched; IP = Innings pitched; W = Wins; L = Losses; ERA = Earned run average; SO = Strikeouts

Relief pitchers
Note: G = Games pitched; W = Wins; L = Losses; SV = Saves; ERA = Earned run average; SO = Strikeouts

Awards and honors
Michael Young, A.L. Batting Title
Mark Teixeira, 1B, Gold Glove
Mark Teixeira, 1B, Silver Slugger Award
Alfonso Soriano, 2B, Silver Slugger Award
All-Star Game

Farm system

LEAGUE CHAMPIONS: Spokane

References

External links

2005 Texas Rangers at Baseball Reference
2005 Texas Rangers at Baseball Almanac

Texas Rangers seasons
Texas Rangers Season, 2005
Range